Lindsay Gordon Bristow (30 March 1888 – 4 September 1960) was an Australian rules footballer who played with Collingwood in the Victorian Football League (VFL).

Notes

External links 

		
Lindsay Bristow's profile at Collingwood Forever

1888 births
1960 deaths
Australian rules footballers from Victoria (Australia)
Collingwood Football Club players
Australian military personnel of World War I